Flerte Fatal (in English: "Fatal Flirtation") is an album by Brazilian singer Rita Lee in partnership with her husband Roberto de Carvalho, released in 1987, the album features hits like "Pega Rapaz", "Bwana" and "Flerte Fatal"

Track listing

 "Brazix Muamba" (Roberto de Carvalho/Rita Lee)
 "Flerte Fatal" (Rita Lee/Roberto de Carvalho)
 "Bwana" (Rita Lee/Roberto de Carvalho)
 "Me recuso" (Rita Lee/Luiz Sérgio Carlini/Lee Marcucci)
 "Blue Moon" (Rodgers/Hart/Version: Rita Lee)
 "Pega rapaz" (Rita Lee/Roberto de Carvalho)
 "Músico Problema" (Rita Lee/Roberto de Carvalho)
 "Pára com isso" (André Christovan/Roberto de Carvalho)
 "Piccola Marina" (Roberto de Carvalho/Antonio Bivar)
 "Xuxuzinho" (Rita Lee/Roberto de Carvalho)

Sales

Notes

Rita Lee albums
1987 albums